The HDF McNeil Stakes is a Melbourne Racing Club Group 3 Thoroughbred horse race for three-year-olds, at set weights with penalties, over a distance of 1200 metres at Caulfield Racecourse, Melbourne, Australia in late August or early September. Total prizemoney for the race is A$200,000.

History

Name
 1989–1994 - HDF McNeil Quality

Distance
 1989–2005 – 1100 metres
 2006 onwards - 1200 metres

Grade
 prior 1991 - Handicap (unlisted)
 1991–1998 - Listed race
 1999 onwards - Group 3

Winners

 2022 - Jacquinot
 2021 - Bruckner
 2020 - Immortal Love
 2019 - Super Seth
 2018 - Native Soldier
 2017 - Merchant Navy
 2016 - Defcon
 2015 - Gold Symphony
 2014 - Chivalry
 2013 - Fast 'N' Rocking
 2012 - Lady Of Harrods
 2011 - Golden Archer
 2010 - Sistine Angel
 2009 - Starspangledbanner
 2008 - Sugar Babe
 2007 - Scenic Blast
 2006 - Miss Finland
 2005 - Danerich
 2004 - Tahni Girl
 2003 - Cahuita
 2002 - Bel Esprit
 2001 - Tully Dane
 2000 - Rapid Man
 1999 - Honour The Name
 1998 - Theatre
 1997 - La Baraka
 1996 - Valourina
 1995 - Gold Ace
 1994 - Danzero
 1993 - Sequalo
 1992 - Snippet's Girl
 1991 - Tierce 
 1990 - Manitor
 1989 - Good Old Ted

See also
 List of Australian Group races
 Group races

References

Horse races in Australia